The Anson Branch is a short canal in the West Midlands, England. It runs for just over one mile from its junction with the Walsall Canal near Forster's bridge. It forms part of the Birmingham Canal Navigations.

The canal is only partially watered and is no longer navigable. It formerly connected with the now defunct Bentley Canal which, in turn, connected with the Wyrley and Essington Canal. The canal has no locks.

History
The branch was authorised by the Birmingham Canal Act of 1768 but was not completed until 1830. It was surveyed by Thomas Telford, who estimated that it would cost £9,499 to build. The route had to cross the River Tame, just to the north of the junction with the Walsall Canal, and this required an aqueduct and an embankment. Telford wanted Thomas Townsend to build it, but he was not keen to accept the contract, as he believed that Telford's estimate was too low. However, he was persuaded, and the contract was signed in March 1830.

It was built to serve the coal mines and a limestone quarry in Bentley, which were owned by the Earl of Lichfield. From the Walsall Canal, it headed in a north-easterly direction, and was almost straight for most of its length, apart from near the mines, where it turned to the north to reach a wharf, from which horse tramways connected to the Bentley mines and furnaces. By 1832, several blast furnaces had also been built near to the terminal basin. In order to tap into the mineral resources further to the north, the Bradford Branch was proposed, but only a small section was built as a canal, and the rest was constructed as a narrow-gauge tramway. It was completed in 1840, and was owned and operated by the canal company.

Following the amalgamation of the Wyrley and Essington Canal with the Birmingham Canal Navigations on 9 February 1840, the new company were keen to create junctions between the two systems. The Bentley Canal was one of these, and ran from the Anson Branch to the Wyrley and Essington at Wednesfield. It opened in 1843.

By the 1890s, many of the mines had been worked out, and the local industry was in serious decline in the early twentieth century. However, the canal found a new use, when a power station was built at Birchills. Construction began in 1914, and some of it was operational by 1916, although it was not officially finished until 1922. It required a water supply, and a pumping station with two Mather and Platt pumps was installed beside the canal. The pumps could deliver 10.6 million gallons (48 Megalitres) per day, and once the water had passed through the power station, it was discharged into the Wyrley and Essington Canal to supply the Wolverhampton level of the Birmingham Canal Navigations. As a result, a pumping station near the top of Birchills locks was switched off and dismantled. From 1927, the power station became the responsibility of West Midlands Joint Electricity Authority, and then the British Electricity Authority following nationalisation in 1948. A second power station was commissioned in 1949.

The section above the Bentley Canal junction was abandoned as a navigation in 1956, and the Bentley Canal and the rest of the Anson Branch were abandoned in 1961. When the M6 motorway was built, it crossed the route of the branch, but because of its water supply function, a culvert was provided. It was large enough for small maintenance craft to pass through, although would not be considered large enough for modern pleasure craft. The power station was decommissioned in 1980, and the pumps were switched off, since when the branch has gradually deteriorated.

Points of interest

See also

Canals of the United Kingdom
History of the British canal system

Bibliography

References

1830 establishments in England
Birmingham Canal Navigations
Transport in Walsall
Canals in the West Midlands (county)
Canals opened in 1830